Oxytripia is a genus of moths of the family Noctuidae.

Species
 Oxytripia orbiculosa (Esper, [1800])
 Oxytripia stephania Sutton, 1964

References
Natural History Museum Lepidoptera genus database
Oxytripia at funet

Noctuinae